Below is a detailed tally of the results of the 2020 Republican Party presidential primary elections in the United States. In most U.S. states outside New Hampshire, votes for write-in candidates remain untallied.

Primary elections and caucuses can be binding or nonbinding in allocating delegates to the respective state delegations to the Republican National Convention. But the actual election of the delegates can be at a later date. Delegates are (1) elected at conventions, (2) from slates submitted by the candidates, (3) selected by the party's state chairman or (4) at committee meetings or (5) elected directly at the party's caucuses and primaries. Until the delegates are apportioned, the delegate numbers are by nature projections, but it is only in the states with nonbinding caucuses where they are not allocated at the primary or caucus date.

Several states have decided to cancel their primaries and caucuses. They cite the fact that Republicans canceled several state primaries when George H. W. Bush and George W. Bush sought a second term in 1992 and 2004, respectively; and Democrats scrapped some of their primaries when Bill Clinton and Barack Obama were seeking reelection in 1996 and 2012, respectively. Hawaii was the only state among the cancelled races to officially appoint their pledged delegates immediately to incumbent President Donald Trump in 2019. Donald Trump's over 18 millions votes he received in the Republican Primary is the most ever for an incumbent President in a primary.

Overview of results

Major candidates

The table below shows the four candidates that have either (a) held public office, (b) been included in a minimum of five independent national polls, or (c) received substantial media coverage. The president's challengers withdrew from the race after the primaries started, or in the case of De la Fuente, accepted one or more  3rd party nominations.

Not shown: Alaska, Wyoming, South Carolina, American Samoa, Guam, Virgin Islands, Northern Marianas

On the ballot in one or more states

The following other candidates are listed by the number of states,  that they are on the ballot.

†Several states provide the number of write-in votes without specifying who they're for.

Results 
As President Trump ran unopposed in several state primaries, and caucuses were canceled to grant him bound delegations by fiat, only contested elections will be listed below.

Early states

Iowa

The Iowa Republican caucus was held on February 3, 2020.

New Hampshire

The New Hampshire Republican primary took place on February 11, 2020.

Super Tuesday (March 3, 2020)
Super Tuesday began with the start of early voting in Minnesota on January 17, 2020, followed by Vermont the following day. By the end of February, all 14 states holding primaries had a substantial number of votes already cast.

In Minnesota, Georgia and Maine, the president ran unopposed.

Alabama

Arkansas

California

Colorado

Massachusetts

North Carolina

Oklahoma

Tennessee

Texas

Utah

Vermont

March 10

Idaho

Michigan

Mississippi

Missouri

March 17

Florida

Notes

References

2020 United States Republican presidential primaries